Richmond is a provincial electoral riding in the Estrie region of Quebec, Canada, which elects members to the National Assembly of Quebec.  It notably includes parts of the city of Sherbrooke as well as the municipalities of Val-des-Sources, Windsor, Saint-Denis-de-Brompton, Danville and Richmond.

It was created for the 1890 election from a part of the Richmond-Wolfe electoral district.

In the change from the 2001 to the 2011 electoral map, its territory was altered substantially.  It lost most of its northern half, primarily to the new Drummond–Bois-Francs electoral district, and expanded southward to include a part of the city of Sherbrooke.

Members of the Legislative Assembly / National Assembly

Election results

^ Change is from redistributed results. CAQ change is from ADQ.

References

External links
Information
 Elections Quebec

Election results
 Election results (National Assembly)
 Election results (QuébecPolitique)

Maps
 2011 map (PDF)
 2001 map (Flash)
2001–2011 changes (Flash)
1992–2001 changes (Flash)
 Electoral map of Estrie region
 Quebec electoral map, 2011 

Quebec provincial electoral districts
Val-des-Sources
Politics of Sherbrooke
Windsor, Quebec